Aksy is a district of Jalal-Abad Region in western Kyrgyzstan. The seat lies at Kerben.

History

Aksy District was established in 1936 as Tash-Kömür District. In 1943, when Tash-Kömür was given city status, the district was renamed Jangy-Jol District, and the administrative seat was moved to the village Jangy-Jol. It absorbed the Kerben District in 1958 (seat moved to Kerben), and Ala-Buka and Chatkal Districts in 1963. Ala-Buka and Chatkal Districts were re-established in 1969. In 1991 Jangy-Jol District was renamed into Aksy District.

Population

Populated places
In total, Aksy District includes 1 town and 68 villages in 11 rural communities. Each rural community can consist of one or several villages. The rural communities and settlements in the Aksy District are:

 The town of Kerben (incl. Kurulush, Kuluk-Döbö, Ak-Döbö, Jetigen, Mamay and Ustukan)
 Ak-Jol (seat: Ak-Jol; incl. Jolborstu, Kara-Tyt, Kechüü, Raykomol, Tegene, Kyzyl-Beyit, Kürp and Razan-Say)
 Ak-Suu (seat: Ak-Suu; incl. Ak-Say, Korgon-Döbö, Kum-Bulung, Mor-Bulak, Töö-Basty)
 Avletim (seat: Avletim; incl. Baykashka-Terek, Deres-Say, Janggaktuu-Bulak, It-Agar, Korgon, Mukur, Tegirmen-Say and Tovar-Say)
 Jangy-Jol (seat: Jangy-Jol; incl. Koy-Tash, Tashtak and Ters)
 Jerge-Tal (seat: Jerge-Tal; incl. Bospiek and Kyzyl-Kapchygay)
 Kara-Jygach (seat: Kara-Jygach; incl. Dardak-Döbö, Kara-Oy, Syny, Tor-Kamysh and Charba)
 Kara-Suu (seat: Top-Janggak; incl. Juzumjan, Kara-Suu, Kezart, Kyzyl-Köl, Say-Bulung, Türdük, Chaldybar and Chat)
 Kashka-Suu (seat: Kashka-Suu; incl. Jangy-Ayyl, Kara-Döbö, Sogot, Tostu, Tuyuk-Jar, Ölöng-Bulak, Charbak and Kara-Bashat)
 Kyzyl-Tuu (seat: Kyzyl-Tuu; incl. Arkyt, Jylgyn and Jol-Say)
 Mavlyanov (seat: Atana; incl. Munduz, Sary-Kashka, Semet, Toruk, Uluk, Chie, Tash-Jar and Janggak)
 Nazaraliev (seat: Kyzyl-Jar; incl. Jyl-Kol, Kum and Naryn)

Prominent people from the Aksy district

There were several prominent people from the Aksy area of the Jalal-Abad region in Kyrgyzstan.

In the 19th century: prominent statesman Nuzup Mingbashy (Yusuf Mingbashi) of the Kokand khanate, poet Jengijok, etc.

In the 20th century:  a poet Temirkul Umetaliev, a writer Tologon Kasymbekov, etc.

At the end of the 20th century - beginning of the 21st century:  politicians Topchubek Turgunaliev, Azimbek Beknazarov, a historian Tashmanbet Kenensariev, a journalist Uran Toktonazarovich Botobekov, etc.

References 

Districts of Jalal-Abad Region